Valle is a surname. Notable people with the surname include:

Ågot Valle (born 1945), Norwegian politician
Alex Valle (born 1978), Peruvian-American professional fighting game player
Amaurys Valle (born 1990), Cuban track-and-field athlete
Ángela Valle (1927–2003), Honduran writer, journalist, essayist
Anna Valle (born 1975), Italian actress
Beatriz Valle (born 1966), Honduran politician
Camila Valle (born 1995), Peruvian rower
Dave Valle (born 1960), American baseball player
Donald Valle, American restaurateur
Eltjon Valle (born 1984), artist from Kuçova, Albania
Héctor Valle (born 1940), Puerto Rican baseball player
Joaquín Valle (born 1916), Spanish professional footballer
Jonatan Valle (born 1984), Spanish professional footballer
José Cecilio del Valle (1780–1834), philosopher, politician, lawyer, and journalist
Marcos Valle (born 1943), Brazilian singer, songwriter and record producer
Ramón Valle (born 1964), Cuban jazz pianist and composer
Richard Valle (1931–1995), American restaurateur
Sebastián Valle (born 1990), Mexican professional baseball player

See also
Valle (disambiguation)

Italian-language surnames
Surnames of South Tyrolean origin